In social choice theory, the spatial model of voting is used to simulate the behavior of voters in an election, either to explain voter behavior, or to estimate the likelihood of desirable or undesirable outcomes under different voting systems.

This model positions voters and candidates in a one- or multi-dimensional space, where each dimension represents an attribute of the candidate that voters care about. Voters are then modeled as having an ideal point in this space, and voting for the nearest candidates to that point. (As this is a mathematical model that can apply to any form of election, including non-governmental elections, each dimension can represent any attribute of the candidates, such as a single political issue sub-component of an issue, or non-political properties of the candidates, such as perceived corruption, health, etc.)

A political spectrum or compass can therefore be thought of as either an attribute space itself, or as a projection of a higher-dimensional space onto a smaller number of dimensions for simplicity. For example, a study of German voters found that at least four dimensions were required to adequately represent all political parties.

Accuracy 
A study of three-candidate elections analyzed 12 different models of voter behavior, including several variations of the impartial culture model, and found the spatial model to be the most accurate to real-world ranked-ballot election data. (Their real-world data was 883 three-candidate elections of 350 to 1,957 voters, extracted from 84 ranked-ballot elections of the Electoral Reform Society, and 913 elections derived from the 1970–2004 American National Election Studies thermometer scale surveys, with 759 to 2,521 "voters".)  A previous study by the same authors had found similar results, comparing 6 different models to the ANES data.

A study of evaluative voting methods developed several models for generating rated ballots, and recommend the spatial model as the most realistic.  (Their empirical evaluation was based on two elections, the 2009 European Election Survey of 8 candidates by 972 voters, and the Voter Autrement poll of the 2017 French presidential election, including 26,633 voters and 5 candidates.)

History 
The earliest roots of the model are the one-dimensional Hotelling's law of 1929 and Black's Median voter theorem of 1948.

See also 

 Issue voting § Models of issue voting
 Location model

References 

Electoral system criteria
Behavioral concepts